Donald Strehle Whitehead (October 10, 1888 – January 2, 1957) was an American politician from Idaho. The state's 23rd and 28th lieutenant governor, he served a combined six years between 1939 and 1951.

Early life
Whitehead was born on December 10, 1888 in Three Oaks, Michigan to parents  William Searing Whitehead and Louise M. Whitehead (nee Strehle).  The family moved to Idaho when Whitehead was six months old.  

Whitehead graduated Boise High School in 1904 and he graduated the University of Idaho in 1907.   

He planned to become an engineer,  but his father's illness forced him to return to the family business; In 1909, Whitehead became a druggist in Boise, and on November 17, 1909 he married Muriel G. Shaw.

Political career
Whitehead began his political career in 1922, when he was elected to the Idaho House of Representatives. In 1929, he was elected Speaker of the House.  
Whitehead was first elected lieutenant governor in 1938 and served in the first administration of Governor C. A. Bottolfsen. He was elected again in 1946 and served a four-year term under Governor C. A. Robins. He previously served as speaker of the state's house of representatives.

In June 1947, Whitehead reported seeing a UFO in Boise. The same day, pilot Kenneth Arnold said he saw a similar object in the Cascades of Washington, near Mount Rainier; the reported sightings received national media coverage.

In 1950, Whitehead announced plans to run for Governor;   A heart attack led him to cancel those plans.

Death
Whitehead died in 1957;  At the time of his death, he was the only person to have served as both Speaker of the Idaho House and as Lt. Governor.    Whitehead had been active in the local Episcopal cathedral and its Scottish Rite organization.

References

1947 ''St. Louis Post-Dispatch article on Whitehead's UFO sighting

Speakers of the Idaho House of Representatives
Lieutenant Governors of Idaho
1888 births
1957 deaths
20th-century American politicians
People from Three Oaks, Michigan